Armands Ližbovskis (born 18 November 1968) is a Paralympian athlete from Latvia competing mainly in F13 (classification) long jump events.

Ližbovskis has competed in three Paralympics.  In the 1992 Summer Paralympics in Barcelona, Spain he competed in the 100m, 200m, long jump and triple jump.  In the 1996 Summer Paralympics in Atlanta, United States again competing in the 100m, 200m, long jump and triple  jump.  His best achievement came in the 2000 Summer Paralympics in Athens, Greece where he competed in the 100m and 200m and won a bronze medal in the long jump.

References

External links

Living people
1968 births
Paralympic athletes of Latvia
Athletes (track and field) at the 1992 Summer Paralympics
Athletes (track and field) at the 1996 Summer Paralympics
Athletes (track and field) at the 2000 Summer Paralympics
Paralympic bronze medalists for Latvia
Latvian male sprinters
Latvian male long jumpers
Latvian male triple jumpers
Medalists at the 2000 Summer Paralympics
Paralympic medalists in athletics (track and field)
Visually impaired sprinters
Visually impaired long jumpers
Visually impaired triple jumpers
Paralympic sprinters
Paralympic long jumpers
Paralympic triple jumpers